"Lollipop (Candyman)" is a song by Danish-Norwegian dance-pop group Aqua. It was released as the fifth overall single from their debut album, Aquarium, in Australasia, North America, and mainland Europe—it was not released in the United Kingdom. "Lollipop" features a prominent role for René Dif, with vocals also from main vocalist Lene. The US CD and cassette single include "Good Morning Sunshine" as the B-side.

Although it said to be one of the group's favorite songs, "Lollipop (Candyman)" failed to replicate the success of "Barbie Girl", "Doctor Jones", and "My Oh My" where it was released. In the United States, it became their second top-40 hit and last song to chart there, peaking at  23. The single reached the top 10 in Sweden and Australia, staying at number three for five consecutive weeks in the latter country.

Critical reception
Larry Flick from Billboard described the song as a "Barbie Girl" "similar-sounding Euro-NRG ditty" and noted that "although "Lollipop" does not have such an immediate, media-friendly punch, it's ultimately just as fun and goofy as its predecessor. Sure, this is pop music at its most frivolous and disposable." Dave Sholin from the Gavin Report commented, "Nothing like a sugar rush, and this is yet another double dose of ear candy from Denmark's leading confectioners." Pop Rescue wrote that it "is laden with pumping beats, and vocal play between René and Lene." They added that "it's quite close to Barbie Girl."

Music video
The video features the group in space, much like in the later "Cartoon Heroes", and includes a fight against aliens and a small robot saving the day.

Track listings

Scandinavian and European CD single
 "Lollipop (Candyman)" (radio edit) – 3:35
 "Lollipop (Candyman)" (extended version) – 5:29

US CD and cassette single
 "Lollipop (Candyman)" – 3:35
 "Good Morning Sunshine" – 4:03

US 12-inch single
A1. "Lollipop (Candyman)" (Fitch Brother's "Sugar Mix") – 6:52
A2. "Lollipop (Candyman)" (extended original mix) – 5:51
B1. "Lollipop (Candyman)" (Razor-N-Go "Lick It Mix") – 12:18

Australian CD single
 "Lollipop (Candyman)" (radio edit) – 2:54
 "Lollipop (Candyman)" (extended mix) – 5:24
 "Lollipop (Candyman)" (DJ Greek's Candy Mix) – 7:28
 "Doctor Jones" (Adrenaline club mix) – 6:22
 "Doctor Jones" (Antiloop club mix) – 9:59
 "Doctor Jones" (Molella & Phil Jay mix) – 6:22
 "Barbie Girl" (video)
 "Doctor Jones" (Metro's full video)

Charts and certifications

Weekly charts

Year-end charts

Certifications

Trivia
On 27 January 2016, the Swiss band Rage Of Light made a trance/melodic death metal cover version of the song.

References

1997 singles
1997 songs
Aqua (band) songs
Songs written by Claus Norreen
Songs written by Lene Nystrøm
Songs written by René Dif
Songs written by Søren Rasted